During the 1997–98 English football season, Doncaster Rovers competed in the Football League Third Division. Doncaster had an awful season finishing bottom of the table and being relegated to the Football Conference. They lost 34 matches, setting a new league record.

Season summary
Doncaster suffered the worst season in their history. They were rooted to the bottom of the table for almost the entirety of the season, had to wait 21 matches for a first league victory of the season, won only four league games all season, finished 15 points adrift of 23rd-placed Brighton & Hove Albion and lost 34 league games, the most for any English club in a season – the worst of these defeats being 7–1 at Cardiff City (who finished 21st) and 8–0 at Leyton Orient. This poor form saw Doncaster rightly relegated from the Football League to the Conference for the first time in their history.

Rovers' poor form came amidst a background of gross interference and poor judgement from the board. Player-manager Kerry Dixon was sacked in August; youth-team coach Dave Cowling replaced him, but only managed the club for two games (losing both) before resigning due to interference from chairman Ken Richardson. Cowling was replaced by experienced Uruguayan Danny Bergara, who allowed Richardson to pick the team: Bergara lasted seven games, picking up only two points. Eventually Richardson's right-hand man Mark Weaver appointed himself manager.

Just weeks after Rovers were relegated, Richardson was found guilty of attempting to set fire to Belle Vue, apparently to claim insurance money to pay off the club's debt.

Kit
Rovers wore four kits during the season, all produced by new kit manufacturer Olympic Sports. The first, worn from August to September, featured sleeves with jagged red shapes on a white background. An alternate kit, with the jagged red shapes also featured on white panels on the sides of the shorts, was also used during this period. From October to April Rovers wore a red kit with white panels on the sides of the shorts, plain red socks with a white band around the ankle and a buttoned collar; this kit was the only one worn by Doncaster this season to bear the club's crest. During May the club returned to wear the first kit, albeit with completely red shorts.
The away kit evoked that worn by the Brazil national side, with a yellow shirt with green collar, sky blue shorts with white panels on the side, and white socks.

None of the kits worn by Doncaster this season carried sponsorship.

Final league table

Results
Doncaster's score comes first

Legend

Football League Third Division

FA Cup

League Cup

Football League Trophy

Squad
Appearances for competitive matches only

References

External links
 Doncaster Rovers 1997–98 at Soccerbase.com

Doncaster Rovers F.C. seasons
Don